WWPX-TV (channel 60) is a television station licensed to Martinsburg, West Virginia, United States, broadcasting the Ion Television network to the northwestern portion of the Washington, D.C. television market. Owned and operated by Ion Media, the station maintains transmitter facilities on Blue Ridge Mountain east of Charles Town, West Virginia.

WWPX-TV operates as a full-time satellite of the main Ion station for the Washington area, Manassas, Virginia–licensed WPXW-TV (channel 66), whose offices are located in Fairfax Station, Virginia. WWPX covers areas of West Virginia's Eastern Panhandle, northern Virginia, central Maryland and south-central Pennsylvania that receive a marginal to non-existent over-the-air signal from WPXW, although there is significant overlap between the two stations' contours otherwise. WWPX is a straight simulcast of WPXW; on-air references to WWPX are limited to Federal Communications Commission (FCC)-mandated hourly station identifications during programming. Aside from the transmitter, WWPX does not maintain any physical presence locally in Martinsburg.

History
Channel 60 signed on October 1, 1991, as WYVN ("Your Valley News"), with studios located in a renovated barn on Discovery Place in Martinsburg. WYVN was the second Fox affiliate in West Virginia, behind Charleston's WVAH-TV (now a Decades affiliate). Unusually for Fox stations in the network's early years, WYVN made a commitment from the beginning to local news and public affairs programming. However, owner Flying A Communications found itself in financial trouble due to the cost of the local news operation and poor ratings from competition with Washington, D.C.-based stations. Flying A Communications filed for bankruptcy in October 1992, and the station suspended newscasts in May 1993.

WYVN was forced off the air when Flying A went into receivership on September 17, 1993. A sale to WUSQ-FM owner Benchmark Communications, who would have converted the station to CBS affiliate WUSQ-TV, was worked out and approved by the station's bankruptcy trustee, but fell through at the last minute; the license was instead sold to Green River Broadcasting, who returned the station to air on September 24 while it worked out a financing plan. Having lost its Fox affiliation, WYVN soldiered on as an independent, and briefly attempted a return of local news from January through February 1994. The station remained unable to emerge from bankruptcy; the studio and equipment were sold to its creditors on April 1, 1994, and they locked out the staff and suspended broadcasting. Paxson Communications acquired the license out of bankruptcy for $1.9 million in late 1994.

The station returned again on September 1, 1996, as WSHE-TV, a Paxson station that aired the company's standard infomercial format, with religious programming in some dayparts. The change was made as a clean break with the troubled history of WYVN, but also to "park" a heritage call sign that Paxson had recently removed from one of its FM stations in Miami (now WMIB). The station changed its call letters to WWPX at the beginning of 1998 and became a charter member of Pax TV along with most of Paxson's other stations on August 31 of that year. It has remained with the network, later known as i: Independent Television and now known as Ion Television, ever since.

WWPX was originally a full affiliate of Pax. In 2002, it converted to a satellite of WPXW. The station could no longer afford its own staff of five master-control operators, and becoming a satellite allowed it to carry only the legal minimum of one manager and one engineer.

Technical information

Subchannels
The station's digital signal is multiplexed:

Analog-to-digital conversion
WWPX-TV shut down its analog signal, over UHF channel 60, on June 12, 2009, the official date in which full-power television stations in the United States transitioned from analog to digital broadcasts under federal mandate. The station's digital signal remained on its pre-transition VHF channel 12. Through the use of PSIP, digital television receivers display the station's virtual channel as its former UHF analog channel 60, which was among the high band UHF channels (52-69) that were removed from broadcasting use as a result of the transition.

References

External links

Ion Television affiliates
Bounce TV affiliates
Court TV affiliates
Laff (TV network) affiliates
Ion Mystery affiliates
Defy TV affiliates
Scripps News affiliates
E. W. Scripps Company television stations
Martinsburg, West Virginia
Mass media in Hagerstown metropolitan area
Television channels and stations established in 1991
WPX-TV
1991 establishments in West Virginia